A mountain man was a North American trapper and explorer in the American frontier including:
Overmountain Men
Voyageurs
Coureurs des bois

Mountain man or mountain men may also refer to:
Mountain Men (TV series)
The Mountain Men, 1980 film
"Mountain Man" (song), a 2009 song by The Crash Kings
 "Mountain Man" (Dean Brody song), 2013
Mountain Man (music group), a singing trio
Mountain Man (novel), by Vardis Fisher
Dashrath Manjhi, who carved a path through a mountain using only a hammer and a chisel
Mountainman, a single stage ultramarathon
Mountain-men, nickname for Scottish Reformed Presbyterians

See also
 Old Man of the Mountain (disambiguation)